The Ministry of Personnel was one of the Six Ministries under the Department of State Affairs in imperial China, Korea, and Vietnam.

Functions
Under the Ming, the Ministry of Personnel was in charge of civil appointments, merit ratings, promotions, and demotions of officials, as well as granting of honorific titles. Military appointments, promotions, and demotions fell under the purview of the Ministry of War.

See also
 Imperial examination
 Scholar-bureaucrat or mandarin
 Examination Yuan

References

Citations

Sources 

 

Government of Imperial China
Six Ministries
Government of the Ming dynasty
Government of the Tang dynasty
Government of the Song dynasty
Government of the Yuan dynasty
Government of the Qing dynasty
Government of the Sui dynasty